The Conseil scolaire Viamonde (CSV) is a public-secular French first language school board, and manages elementary and secondary schools in the Ontario Peninsula and the Greater Golden Horseshoe. The school board operates 41 elementary schools and 15 secondary schools within that area. The school board operates two offices, one in Toronto, and one in Welland. The educational management office is located in the Maple Leaf neighbourhood of Toronto, whereas the business and financial management office is located in Welland.

The school board was formed in 1998 after several local school boards were amalgamated into the French-language Public District School Board No. 58. From 1999 to 2010, the school board was known as Conseil Scolaire de District du Centre-Sud-Ouest. CSV is one of four members of the Association des conseils scolaires des écoles publiques de l'Ontario (ACÉPO).

History 

The board was created 1 January 1998 when the Government of Ontario decided to amalgamate several secular French school boards in the Ontario Peninsula (an area made of Southwestern Ontario, and the Greater Golden Horseshoe). School boards that were amalgamated included:

Shortly after the merger, the school board changed its name from French-language Public District School Board No. 58 to Conseil scolaire du district du Centre-Sud-Ouest. The school board continued to operate as Centre-Sud-Ouest until November 15, 2010, when its name was changed to Conseil scolaire Viamonde.

List of schools 

CSV presently operates 41 elementary schools and 15 secondary schools throughout Southwestern Ontario and most of the Greater Golden Horseshoe. The area in which the school board operates and provides schooling for covers 68,180 km2 of Ontario.

See also 
List of school districts in Ontario
List of high schools in Ontario
Conseil scolaire catholique Providence

References

External links 

 Conseil scolaire Viamonde 
 English Information

Viamonde
Education in Toronto
Education in Hamilton, Ontario
Education in Welland
Educational institutions established in 1998
1998 establishments in Ontario